The Man Tamer is a 1921 American drama film directed by Harry B. Harris and written by A. P. Younger. The film stars Gladys Walton, Rex De Rosselli, William Welsh, Charles Murphy, J. Parker McConnell and Roscoe Karns. The film was released on May 30, 1921, by Universal Film Manufacturing Company.

Cast          
Gladys Walton as Kitty Horrigan
Rex De Rosselli as Jim Horrigan
William Welsh as Hayden Delmar
Charles Murphy as Tim Murphy 
J. Parker McConnell as Charlie Parrish
Roscoe Karns as Bradley P. Caldwell Jr.
C. Norman Hammond as Bradley P. Caldwell Sr.

References

External links
 

1921 films
1920s English-language films
Silent American drama films
1921 drama films
Universal Pictures films
American silent feature films
American black-and-white films
1920s American films